The RB engine is an oversquare 2.0–3.0 L straight-6 four-stroke gasoline engine from Nissan, originally produced from 1985 to 2004. The RB followed the 1983 VG-series V6 engines to offer a full, modern range in both straight or V layouts.

The RB engine family includes single overhead camshaft (SOHC) and double overhead camshaft (DOHC) engines. Both SOHC and DOHC versions have an aluminium head. The SOHC versions have 2 valves per cylinder and the DOHC versions have 4 valves per cylinder; each cam lobe moves only one valve. All RB engines have belt driven cams and a cast iron block. Most turbo models have an intercooled turbo (the exceptions being the single cam RB20ET & RB30ET engines), and most have a recirculating factory blow off valve (the exceptions being when fitted to Laurels and Cefiros) to reduce compressor surge when the throttle quickly closes.

The RB engines are derived from the six cylinder L20A engine, which has the same bore and stroke as the RB20. All RB engines were made in Yokohama, Japan where the VR38DETT engine was made. Some RB engines were rebuilt by Nissan's NISMO division at the Omori Factory in Tokyo as well. All Z-Tune Skylines were rebuilt at the Omori Factory.

Production of the RB series resumed in 2019, after a 15 year hiatus.

Bore and stroke
All Nissan engines follow a naming convention, identifying the engine family (in this case, RB), displacement, features present—see the list of Nissan engines for details.

The stock dimensions for the Nissan RB Engine:
 RB20 - , bore x stroke: 
 RB24 - , bore x stroke: 
 RB25 - , bore x stroke: 
 RB26 - , bore x stroke: 
 RB30 - , bore x stroke: 
 "D" indicates a dual overhead cam as opposed to a single overhead cam
 "E" indicates the individual engine ports are electronically fuel-injected 'single-cam'
 "S" indicates the engine is carbureted
 "T" indicates the engine has a factory installed turbocharger
 "TT" indicates the engine has factory installed twin turbochargers
 "P" indicates the engine runs on LPG (liquefied petroleum gas)

RB20DE (2.0L I6 NA/T)

The first RB20ET/DE/DET engines were fitted to the HR31 Skyline and the Nissan Fairlady 200ZR (Z31 chassis), produced from August 1985. The early twin cam engines featured the NICS (Nissan Induction Control System) injection system, while the later twin cam engines used ECCS (Electronic Concentrated Control System). Later versions which used ECCS engine management, discarded the twelve tiny runners for six much larger ones (though they retained twelve ports on the head, so there was a splitter plate). It was also fitted to the A31 Cefiro, C32 and C33 Laurel. The Fairlady 200ZR was fitted with an intercooled NICS type RB20DET.

The first RB20E engine was used in the C32 Nissan Laurel, produced from October 1984.

Laurels, R32 Skyline and Cefiros used the second (1989–1993) series RB20E/DE/DET. This had an improved head design, and used the ECCS injection system. These later motors are known as "Silver Top" engines.

The RB20DET-R was used in the Nissan Skyline 2000GTS-R (HR31) and was limited to 800 units.

There were a variety of 2.0 L RB20 engines produced:
RB20E
single-cam
Power:  at 5600 rpm
Torque:  at 4400 rpm
Camshaft duration: 232° intake; 240° exhaust
Camshaft lift: 7.3 mm intake, 7.8 mm exhaust
RB20ET
single-cam, turbocharged
Power:  at 6000 rpm
Torque:  at 3200 rpm
RB20DE
twin-cam
Power:  at 6400 rpm
Torque:  at 5600 rpm
Camshaft duration: 232° intake, 240° exhaust
Camshaft lift:  intake,  exhaust
RB20DET
twin-cam, turbocharged
Power:  at 6400 rpm
Torque:  at 3200 rpm
Camshaft duration: 240° intake, 240° exhaust; 248° intake, 240° exhaust ("Red Top")
Camshaft lift:  intake,  exhaust;  intake,  exhaust ("Red Top")
RB20P
single-cam, 12 valves, autogas LPG
Power:  at 5600 rpm
Torque:  at 2400 rpm
RB20DET-R
twin-cam, turbocharged
Power:  at 6400 rpm
Torque:  at 4800 rpm
RB20DE NEO
twin-cam
Power: 
Torque:

RB24S (2.4L I6 NA/T)

This is a comparatively rare engine, as it was not produced for the Japanese domestic market. These were fitted to some left hand drive Nissan Cefiros exported from Japan new. Mechanically, the RB24S combines an RB30E head, RB25DE/DET block and RB20DE/DET crank with 34 mm height pistons. The resulting  bore and stroke combined to form a  inline-six engine.

This engine used carburetors instead of the Nissan ECCS fuel injection system. It is able to rev higher than the RB25DE/DET (as it has the same stroke as the RB20DE/DET) as well as being almost the same displacement as the RB25DE/DET. A common modification is to fit a twin cam head from other RB series motors while retaining the carburetor set-up.

RB25DE (2.5L I6 NA/T)

The RB25 series of engines was first introduced in the R32 Nissan Skyline GTS25 sedan and coupe models. RB25DE (Naturally Aspirated) and DET (Turbocharged) engines produced from August 1993 also featured NVCS (Nissan Variable Cam System) for the intake cam. This gave the new RB25DE more power and torque at lower rpm than the previous model. From 1995,(Series 2 Engines) both the RB25DE and RB25DET had a revised electrical system and the turbocharger on the RB25DET(S2) had a ceramic turbine
wheel rather than aluminium. The most obvious change to the system was the introduction of ignition coils with built in ignitors, therefore the coil ignitor that was on previous models was not used. Other changes were, different air flow meter, engine ECU, cam angle sensor and throttle position sensor. Mechanically Series 1 and Series 2 are very similar, the only mechanical difference would be the camshafts as the Series 2 Cam Angle Sensor's shaft that goes into the exhaust cam is slightly different. Early Series 2 featured the traditional Mitsubishi CAS which was later swapped for the Black CAS because of a positioning tooth which occasionally broke off.

In May 1998 a NEO head was fitted, which enabled the engine to be classified as a low emission vehicle (LEV) engine due to their lower fuel consumption and emission output. The combustion chamber of the head is smaller so model-specific pistons are used to compensate. The turbo received the larger OP6 turbine which some came with steel compressor and turbine wheels, where others had the nylon plastic compressor wheel and ceramic turbine wheel. Turbo engines were upgraded to use GT-R spec connecting rods. Some also used an N1 type oil pump and had the oil pump drive collar on the crank revised to help cope with the breakage problems associated with fast, high revs.
All in all they are quite a different engine in their own right - a culmination of 20 years of Nissan RB engine building rolled into one.

The non-VCT, non-turbo RB25DE was fitted to the R32 Skyline, the VCT turbo and non-turbo was fitted to R33 Skylines and the WNC34 Stagea. Early R34 Skylines use the non-NEO RB, later Skyline and Stagea (WGNC34) models use the NEO version.

The 2.5 L RB25 engine was produced in four different forms:

RB25DE
twin-cam, non-turbo with 10:1 compression ratio
Power:  at 6000 rpm
Torque:  at 4000 rpm
RB25DET
twin-cam, turbocharged (T3 Turbo) with 8.5:1 compression ratio
Power:  
Torque: 
RB25DE NEO
twin-cam, non-turbo with 10:1 compression ratio
Power:  at 6000 rpm
Torque:  at 4000 rpm
RB25DET NEO
twin-cam, turbocharged (T3 Turbo, "45V3" with OP-6 Compressor) with 9:1 compression ratio
Power:  at 6400 rpm
Torque:  at 3200 rpm)

RB26DE (2.6L I6 NA)
The RB26DE engine is a  Inline-six engine manufactured by Nissan, for use in the 1992 model Nissan Skyline Autech Version R32 sedan.  The RB26DE engine is made from cast iron, while the cylinder head is made from aluminium alloy, which contains DOHC 4 valves per cylinder (24 valves in total) setup. The intake of the RB26DE also utilizes the same six individual (3 sets of 2) throttle assemblies found in the RB26DETT instead of a single throttle body.  The RB26DE Engine & ECU were tuned by Autech / S&S Engineering to make 220PS at 6800rpm / 25.0kgm at 5200rpm.  The RB26DE has a higher compression ratio (10.5:1) than the RB26DETT (8.5:1).

RB26DE
twin-cam, non-turbo with 10.5:1 compression ratio
Power: 
Torque: 
Bore: 86.0mm
Stroke: 73.7mm

RB26DETT (2.6L I6 TT)
The RB26DETT engine is a  Inline-six engine manufactured by Nissan, for use in the 1989-2002 Nissan Skyline GT-R. The RB26DETT engine block is made from cast iron, while the cylinder head is made from aluminium alloy, which contains DOHC 4 valves per cylinder (24 valves in total) setup. The intake of the RB26DETT varies from other RB-series motors in that it has six individual (3 sets of 2 throttle assemblies that are siamesed together) instead of a single throttle body.

While the published figures from Nissan were as quoted above, it has been known among enthusiasts that the car actually had a factory power output closer to the  figure. The RB26 is widely known and became quite popular for its strength and power potential thanks to its iron block and forged internals, making it a modification friendly platform for tuners and aftermarket modifications in general.

Some factory features of the RB26DETT:
 6 throttle body intake
 Solid lifter valve actuation, shim under bucket
 Belt driven cams
 CAS (crank angle sensor) driven off exhaust cam, tells ECU (engine control unit) crank/cam position 
 water cooled, oil pressure lubed turbos
 OEM cast pistons have cooling channels under the crowns (extra oil cooling to keep piston temperatures down)
 Piston oil squirters
 Sodium filled exhaust valves
 8 Counter weighted crankshaft
 'I' beam connecting rods

There is a common oiling problem with the pre-1992 R32 RB26 motors, as the surface where the crankshaft meets the oil pump was machined too small, eventually leading to oil pump failure at high rpm. This issue was resolved in later versions of the RB26 with a wider oil pump drive. Aftermarket performance parts makers also make oil pump extension drive collars to rectify this problem. More recently a spline drive solution has been developed by an aftermarket tuner Supertec Racing who moves away from the OEM flat drive system and uses splines to drive the oil pump gears in the same way as Toyota's 1JZ-GTE engine as found in the Supra MKIII. This kit is available for most uprated RB26 oil pumps including Nissans own OEM, N1 and Nismo although most high hp RB engines all over the world have been proven to be reliable without spline driven oil pumps when built and tuned correctly.

Besides minor cosmetic updates and ECU fine tunings, changes were made in the R34 generation to ball bearing T28 turbochargers as opposed to journal bearing turbos. The R34 GT-R turbos retained the ceramic exhaust turbine wheel. Models that had steel exhaust turbine wheels included the R32 Nismo, R32-R33-R34 N1 models and R34 Nür spec skyline GT-R's.

R34 GT-R model RB26DETT engine specific differences to the R32-R33 engines include:
 Candy red cam/coil pack covers
 Different coil cover emblem
 Plastic CAM gear cover
 Non-painted inlet plenum (apparently also a lighter casting)
 Hitachi CAS (Crank angle sensor) has different drive fitting compared to earlier R32-R33 exhaust cams
 Igniter built into coil packs (no igniter pack on the rear of coil cover)
 Ball bearing turbochargers with ceramic exhaust turbine wheels
 Stainless steel dump pipes
 Sump front differential has a different ratio (3:55)
 Different diameter coolant/heater pipes on intake side of block
 Dual mass flywheel

Originally the R32 GT-R was planned to have a 2.4L RB24DETT, and compete in the 4000 cc class (in Group A rules, the displacement is multiplied by 1.7 if the engine is turbocharged). This was when Nismo was going through the process of designing the R32 GT-R to be a Group A race car. But when the engineers added the AWD system, they found it made the car heavier than expected and as a result, much less competitive. Nismo made the decision to make the engine a 2.6L twin turbo, and compete in the higher 4500 cc class, resulting in the RB26DETT known today.

The RB26DETT was used in the following vehicles:
 Nissan Skyline GT-R BNR32
 Nissan Skyline GT-R BCNR33
 Nissan Skyline GT-R Autech Version 40th Anniversary   BCNR33 (Autech factory-installed RB26DETT and AWD 5spd transmission in R33 sedan chassis)
 Nissan Skyline GT-R BNR34
Nissan Stagea 260RS WGNC34改 (RS4 Chassis used)
 Tommykaira ZZII (concept car)

RB26DETT N1 (Modified 2.6L I6 TT)
The RB26DETT N1 is a modified version of the RB26DETT engine, developed by Nismo (Nissan Motorsports) for Group A and Group N motorsport. Nismo found that the standard RB26DETT engine required too much maintenance for use in a Group-A or Group-N race car and subsequently designed the N1 block. This was first used in Bathurst Australia. Nismo balanced the crankshaft to a higher specification than stock, as the standard RB26DETT engine experiences vibrations between 7000 and 8000 rpm. The engine also received improved water and oil channels within the engine block. The N1 engine also has upgraded camshafts and upgraded turbochargers.

Although all versions of the RB26DETT N1 engine use Garrett T25 turbochargers, the specification of the turbochargers changed through the 3 generations of the RB26DETT N1 engine (R32, R33, and R34). The R32, and R33 versions used Journal Bearing T25 Turbochargers. The R34 RB26DETT N1 engine used Garrett GT25 turbo chargers (which use a set of ball bearings).

The biggest difference between the turbochargers used in the N1 engine, and the standard RB26DETT engine, is that the turbine wheels in the turbocharger are made from steel, rather than the ceramic used for the standard RB26DETT turbochargers. The ceramic turbine wheels are found to be very unreliable when used at high rotational speeds inducing higher centrifugal forces (such as when the turbochargers are used at a higher boost pressure than stock). With the advances in manufacturing technology such as sealing and material processes.

The Nismo RB26DETT N1 engine block uses an  bore which can be bored up to either . The N1 block is cast with an identification mark of 24U, whereas the standard RB26DETT block is marked with 05U. The RB26DETT N1 block is compatible with all GT-R engine bays.

RB26DETT Z2 (2.8L I6 TT Forged Edition)
This is the engine used in the Nissan Skyline GT-R Z-Tune built by Nismo.

RB30E (3.0L I6 NA/T)

RB30 were produced from 1985 - 1991:
 RB30S GQ Patrol - carburetted single-cam  at 4,800 rpm,  at 3000 rpm
 RB30E VL Commodore - fuel-injected single-cam  at 5,200 rpm,  at 3,600 rpm)
 RB30E R31 Skyline - fuel-injected single-cam  at 5,200 rpm,  at 3,600 rpm) due to a different exhaust system, later revised down to 114kw.
 RB30E R31 Skyline GTS1 - fuel-injected single-cam  at 5,500 rpm,  at 3,900 rpm)
 RB30E R31 Skyline GTS2 - fuel-injected single-cam  at 5,600 rpm,  at 4,400 rpm)
 RB30ET VL Commodore - fuel-injected single-cam turbo  at 5,600 rpm,  at 3,200 rpm)

This motor was produced for use in the Skylines, Patrols and rights bought by Holden because the Holden 202 (3.3 L) powering the Holden Commodore could no longer satisfy tightening emissions requirements, and with all new cars required to run on unleaded petrol by 1986 a quick replacement was needed. Nissan Motor Co. sold the RB30E to Holden for the VL Commodore. Because the radiator is fitted lower in relation to the engine in the VL, there is an increased likelihood of air locks forming in the (alloy) cylinder head if the correct bleeding procedure isn't followed, causing this to overheat and warp. This was less likely in the R31 Skyline as the radiator is mounted higher. The engine proved to be very reliable apart from this issue. The RB30S was found in some Middle Eastern R31 Skylines and in some Nissan Patrols.

The turbocharged RB30ET (producing ) was found only in the VL Commodore due to the conditions set out by Holden to Nissan in the contract to supply engines. It consists of a lower compression RB30E bottom end, more powerful oil pump, knock sensor, Garrett T3 turbocharger,  injectors, different intake manifold and supporting ECU. The motor itself is still popular today in Australian and New Zealand motorsport and drag racing in VL Commodores, R31 Skylines and swaps in other vehicles.

Nissan Special Vehicles Division Australia produced two limited models of R31 Skylines, the GTS1 and GTS2. These contained slightly more powerful RB30E engines, containing longer opening duration cams and better flowing exhausts.
 GTS1 RB30E - injected single-cam  at 5,500 rpm,  at 3,500 rpm) - special cam profile, special exhaust
 GTS2 RB30E - injected single-cam  at 5,600 rpm,  at 4,400 rpm) - special cam profile, special exhaust, piggy back computer, valve porting

RB30DE (3.0L I6 NA) 
These rare engines were used in the Tommykaira M30 based on the R31 Skyline GTS and R32 Skyline GTSt. For the R31 M30, a modified RB20DE head was bolted onto the RB30E block.

For the R32 M30, the bore was enlarged to 87 mm and increased the displacement to 3030 cc. The head was also replaced with RB26DE head.

More commonly a hybrid conversion with an RB30E block and a twin cam RB25 head without a turbo is also used as a basis for the RB30DE.

RB30DET (3.0L I6 T)

Nissan did not produce this engine. It refers to a turbocharged engine using an RB30E short block with the twin-cam head installed from another RB series engine. A common hybrid in Australia and New Zealand (referred to as the RB25/30 or RB26/30) uses an RB30E bottom end mated to a RB25DE, RB25DET or RB26DETT cylinder head and turbo (RB20DE and DET heads are not used as the bores are different in size (RB30  RB20 ); but were originally modified and used on the Tommykaira RB30DE as the RB25 engine did not exist at the time). The RB25DE cylinder head from the A31 Cefiro C33 Laurel or R32 Skyline (aka: Non VCT) can be used. The RB25DET (from the R33 Skyline or C34 Laurel or Stagea) head is also used, however an external oil feed must be fabricated for the variable cam timing (VCT) on the RB25DET, and the oil galleries at the front of the engine are misaligned. The variable cam timing may be disconnected altogether. It may be necessary to reduce the size of the oil restrictors in the block and machine a full face oil pump drive collar onto the crank, (to prevent it shattering at high RPM), with the use of a twin cam oil pump.

The fitment of a twin cam head from any of these engines onto a standard compression RB30E bottom end gives a forced induction friendly compression ratio (around 8.2:1), for a mild to moderately modified street turbo engine, making the conversion popular amongst those who would otherwise convert their RB30E to a high compression RB30ET using original ET bolt on externals.

Although it has a larger displacement than the RB26DETT, maximum possible horsepower is less, as the RB30 block lacks the RB26 block's internal bracing, and consequently cannot rev as high due to harmonic issues at ~7500 rpm. To compensate, the RB30DET produces more torque at lower revs due to its longer stroke. However they have been known to reach engine speeds up to 11,000 rpm with extensive balancing and blueprinting.

It is available as an assembled short block, containing billet chrome-molybdenum crank, billet chrome-molybdenum H-beam connecting rods, forged pistons, and costs ¥1,500,000.

RB-X GT2 and RB28DET (2.8L I6 T)
The RB-X GT2 (designed and built by REINIK) is an engine specially made for the NISMO 400R.

This engine was manufactured with a reinforced cylinder block and cylinder head, metal head gasket, pistons with cooling channels, forged crank shaft, forged connecting rods, N1 turbine with reinforced actuator, high flow intake, stainless down pipe, and low exhaust resistant sport cats, most of which were not offered for the RB26DETT.  RB-X GT2 engines competed in LeMans 24hr race, Pikes Peak, and other forms of motorsports. GT500 and Z-tune engines are also based on REINIK's design although later built by NISMO's Omori Factory.

REINIK also made over 20 RB28DET based on the R33 RB25DET. These engines were ordered by Prince Nissan Dealership network for a special edition R33 GT25t called 280 Type-MR.

Stroker kits
There are many stroker kits available for RB Engines (some only available as proper kits while others being achievable by using cranks from other engines, for example a GT-R crank, pistons and rods in an RB25DET will make its displacement 2.6L as the Bore is the same as an RB26DETT).

Achievable Stroker Displacements for RB Engines:
RB20 - 2.2, 2.4
RB25 - 2.6, 2.7, 2.8
RB26 - 2.7, 2.8, 2.9, 3.0, 3.15
RB30 - 3.2 (Nitto), 3.3 (RIPS), 3.4 (Spool Imports)
RB26 - 3.2, 3.3, and 3.4. (Project RB)

See also
 List of Nissan engines

References

RB
Straight-six engines
Gasoline engines by model